Isle of Wight Wildlife Management Area is a state wildlife management area (WMA) of Maryland located on the Isle of Wight, a small peninsula between the St. Martin's River and Isle of Wight Bay in Worcester County.  Although called Isle of Wight, a small strip of marsh and road connects it with the mainland.

The WMA is bisected by Maryland Route 90, one of the two principal highway routes into Ocean City.  Despite this, the WMA attracts many birds, especially those dependent upon tidal marshes and bays, including great blue herons and green herons, black ducks, buffleheads, scaup, brant, Canada and snow geese, the common loon, and swans.

Although hunting in season is permitted in the WMA, the area south of Route 90 is closed to hunting and is managed as a day use recreation area by Worcester County.

References

External links
Isle of Wight Wildlife Management Area

Wildlife management areas of Maryland
Protected areas of Worcester County, Maryland
IUCN Category V